As of 2022, the International Union for Conservation of Nature (IUCN) listed 40 animal species as extinct in the wild. That is approximately 0.04% of all evaluated animal species. The IUCN also lists five animal subspecies as extinct in the wild.

This is a complete list of wild animal species and subspecies listed as extinct by the IUCN. Some of these species, such as Aylacostoma guaraniticum, Aylacostoma stigmaticum, and Partula faba have since become entirely extinct.

Molluscs

Species

Subspecies

Arthropods
Oahu deceptor bush cricket (Leptogryllus deceptor)
Simandoa cave roach (Simandoa conserfariam)
Socorro isopod (Thermosphaeroma thermophilum)

Chordates
There are 22 chordate species assessed as extinct in the wild.

Amphibians
Wyoming toad (Anaxyrus baxteri)
Kihansi spray toad (Nectophrynoides asperginis)

Mammals
Père David's deer (Elaphurus davidianus)
Scimitar oryx (Oryx dammah)

Reptiles
Christmas Island blue-tailed skink (Cryptoblepharus egeriae)
Christmas Island chained gecko (Lepidodactylus listeri)

Fish

Birds

See also 
 List of plants that are extinct in the wild

References 

Animals
Animals
Extinct in the wild